Martha Cecilia's Kristine is a 2010 Philippine romantic-drama television series based on 54 books of the PHR pocketbook series of the same name created by Martha Cecilia, developed by Rondel P. Lindayag, Roldeo T. Endrinal, and Julie Anne R. Benitez, and directed by Rory B. Quintos, Richard I. Arellano, and Theodore C. Boborol. It also serves as both the 12th installment of the Precious Hearts Romances Presents series and the first adaptation on a primetime slot. The series stars Cristine Reyes as Kristine Jewel Fortalejo, and Denise Laurel as Kristine Emerald Fortalejo-de Silva, together with leading men Zanjoe Marudo, Rafael Rosell, and Rayver Cruz, with an ensemble cast consisting of Lito Legaspi, Irma Adlawan, William Lorenzo, Angel Jacob, Carla Martinez, and Eric Fructuoso in their supporting roles. The series premiered on ABS-CBN's Primetime Bida nighttime block, replacing Rubi from August 16, 2010 to February 11, 2011.

The series is about two rival families—the Fortalejos and the de Silvas— two sisters of the Fortalejo family unexpectedly fall in love with a de Silva.

It was also the official offering of the celebration of 60 Years of Pinoy Soap Opera.

Plot

Book One: Epilogue
Right before the big feud between the Fortalejo and De Silva families, Alicia De Silva was deeply in love with Don Leon Fortalejo. Don Leon, already married to Kristine Esmeralda Lopez-Fortalejo, refused to be with her until one night when Alicia sneaked in his bedroom. That mistake lead to being pregnant and Ernesto De Silva (Alicia's father) calling it "disgracing the family". Since Alicia lied about Romano Fortalejo (Don Leon's favorite child) being the father of her child, the two business partners, Don Leon and Ernesto arranged a marriage for their children. Romano and Ana Marie Soriano, being in love together, escaped to live their own lives while leaving Alicia at the altar on the day of their marriage. This enraged Ernesto to a fight causing his life and Don Leon's left arm. Alfon De Silva, Ernesto oldest son seeking for revenge raped and killed Esmeralda. Due to the pain of losing his wife, Don Leon announced the feud and disowning Romano.''

Years later, Romano and Ana bore two children, Kristine Emerald Fortalejo and Kristine Jewel Fortalejo (not knowing of the feud). Romano died leaving a lot of hospital bills. A penny away to being poor, Ana told the whole story about their background telling her children to never take the inheritance left by Esmeralda. Emerald, not listening drove to Villa Kristine to receive the inheritance but accidentally drove to the Hacienda De Silva. There she met Marco De Silva who kidnapped her but later fell deeply in love with each other.

Jewel almost dying of worry for her sister, went to Paso De Blas hoping to find Emerald. There, she met Jamie Reyes in a funny way and pretended to be his wife to be accepted in the Hacienda De Silva as a worker. Many days past of working in the sun and finding Emerald, but Jewel and Jamie fell in love with each other.

After many conflicts with Alfon, Don Cesar Zaragoza, and Don Leon the Fortalejo family was reunited. Marco and Emerald were also broken hearted because a certain deal with Don Leon and Julia De Silva were made. Emerald vowed to be an enemy to Marco. Marco still tries to clear his name and prove that Margarita Fortalejo is a murderer. Although Don Leon wants Lance for Jewel instead of Jamie, his driver, many escapes by Jewel and Jamie were planned to be with each other. But when Don Leon learned that his son, Bernard Fortalejo is alive, he tries hard to find the lovers. Bernard Fortalejo was revealed to be Jamie Reyes a fact that will ruin Jewel and Jamie's lives.

Meanwhile, Alfon De Silva showed up in a bar in Paso De Blas where Margarita was drinking, and made a deal to be partners. Then the rival between the Fortalejo and De Silva stopped when Don Leon Fortalejo re-arranged peace to Paso De Blas. Suddenly, Bernard De Silva Fortalejo "Jaime Reyes" showed up and attempted to kill his father Don Leon for forbidding their love (Jewel and "Jaime"). Don Leon said that "Jaime Reyes" is Bernard De Silva Fortalejo and Don Leon and Alicia De Silva's son making Jewel and him "uncle and niece". After the event when Don Leon went to his car, the car suddenly exploded causing Don Leon's death (caused by Gemma Zaragoza for revenge).

Right after the incident, Margarita Fortalejo-Cervantes is finding a way to claim the riches of her late father Don Leon Fortalejo.  The last will and testament of Don Leon giving his properties to Jewel Fortalejo, Emerald Fortalejo, Ana Fortalejo, Bernard Fortalejo, Jose Cervantes, Margarita Cervantes and their son, Nathaniel Cervantes. The last will and testament of Don Leon gave Bernard, Jewel, and Emerald many of his riches, gave Margarita's family little, and since he gave Villa Kristine to Romano and Ana is his wife, Ana owns it. This outraged Margarita to anger when she found out that her father gave her very little, causing Margarita to find a way to get all of her father's riches.

Suddenly Stella Ilarmo (Jewel's biological mother) showed up in Paso De Blas claiming her daughter Jewel Fortalejo, which means that Jewel is not the daughter of Romano and Ana Fortalejo and the sister of Emerald Fortalejo. Margarita paid Alfon De Silva to investigate Ana, then Stella showing up in Villa Kristine made Ana frightened to reveal her deep secret about Jewel's real identity. Stella saw Jewel and Ana introduced Stella as her "friend" which is a lie because Stella is really Ana's sister. Stella applied as Jewel's assistant which made Margarita very curious about the real identity of Stella making Margarita pay Alfon to investigate Stella. Then, Alfon revealed that Jewel is not a true Fortalejo making her and Jaime's love "unforbidden" because Jewel is not a Fortalejo meaning that she is not the niece of Bernard. Upon Margarita knowing that Jewel is not a real Fortalejo and making Jewel and Bernard to love each other (married) again stirred up Margarita on finding a way on making Jewel and Bernard not love each other because she thought that if Jewel marries Jaime making Jewel a Fortalejo. Margarita thought that it would be harder for her to claim his father's riches when Jewel marries Jaime. Emerald Fortalejo and Marco De Silva marries as well as Jewel and Bernard making Jewel a Fortalejo. The story continues on the sons and daughters of Jewel, Jaime, Emerald and Marco up to the last true Fortalejo living namely Leon Fortalejo. Leon Fortalejo will show up at the last book (book 52) of the series as the last Fortalejo living.

As the first book of the television series ends in Book 52 in the Martha Cecilia's Kristine Book Series. As Stella enters the lives of Anna, and Jewel, complications arise as Jewel is with Jaime. Fate has its ways of putting them in harm as well, as Jewel leaves he Mansion after her complications and dealing with family. Hostility arises and she decides to go on with a little trip to Lance's farm. After a few days of spending time with Lance, she decides to occupy a little time at the manor, but leaves abruptly as she decides to go back to the place Jaime and Jewel spent time with each other. Jaime is already there and Jewel and Jaime spend time avoiding each other as they know that they cannot fall for each other. Jewel tries to hold back tears, and pain, as she tries to deliberately hold it back as Lance is in her heart now as she is unaware that she is not a Fortalejo. Jaime and Jewel's encounter makes them so happy but at home issues begin as of her disappearance. Anna and Stella, confront each other of being a mother to Jewel, and as for Stella she does not know that the man she slept with Alfon, is using her to get through his plans, but as she makes a phone call she is not there for Jewel, but indeed for the money. Meanwhile, Margarita, is now ignored by her husband, and son and decides to make a scheme. She collaborates with Alfon, into kidnapping Anna who is Alfon's obsession after the near encounter, while Jewel is Margarita's plan to kill after losing everything especially her inheritance.

Book Two: Prequel 
As Book 1 ends in the television series adaptation of Martha Cecilia's Kristine Book Series, Jewel and Jaime are in each other's arms once again, and Lance tries to convince Jewel who she will pick at almost any point, the one man she truly loves, or the one that is now healing her broken heart. Margarita's schemes makes it hectic and unraveling. What will Jaime and Marco uncover about Stella and Alfon's relationship as they are unaware of Stella? Meanwhile, as secrets unravel, Jewels safety is at risk as she is now in Lance's arms. Fate also brings her to the unaware truth that Stella is her mother as she runs away from her home she instantly forgives but one day she and Jaime are in each other's hands again but Alfon and Stella are over and done with and now Margarita is up to something. After an evening with Lance, Jewel finds her mother Anna and Stella in a bitter argument of a secret. But as it unravels, Jewel finds out she is not the real Fortalejo leaving her to confront her mother, and Stella who is her biological mother in her heartache. She runs back to the village where her romance with Jaime was left and now she finds himself confessing to a group of villagers his love for her as she sees him. She then says yes and agrees to marry him after she finds out the truth, but as she runs back home she tells Anna she's leaving and she and Jaime get married but are now lost in a happily ever after. As they come back to the Fortalejo manor, Stella decides to leave the manor to find a job in Taiwan but things are cut short when Alfon traps Anna and Stella. Stella thinks that she is on Alfon's side that is betrayed and later ends up being held hostage calling Jewel into a trap. When she is followed by Lance as she and Jaime arrive to the scene, Anna is begging and so is Stella for Alfon to let go and let them leave. But the plan is cut short as Anna and Stella both find Jewel arrive. Anna is still taken hostage leaving her and Stella. With the help of Lance, Jaime and Marco to the rescue, Margarita leaves Jewel and Stella being held hostage unaware she is also part of the plot. A fight leashes out leaving Jewel in the building with Stella but she gets shot and saves Jewel but. the building starts to burn. And to Margarita's extent, she thinks that her plan to eliminate and get her revenge result her to be successful but turns out as things go good for her, lives are in a living hell with the death of Jewel. Will the truth be prevailed or is there any evidence or hope that Jewel maybe alive after all? At the end, Margarita traps Jewel and plans to bomb the place she is in. But Bernard, Marco, Scarlet, and Nathaniel are there to save her. Suddenly, Margarita finds out that her son is out there because she was watching the surveillance camera. So she let Jewel out and ran for they had very little time until the bomb would burst. After they were all safe, Margarita realized she forgot her important necklace that was the key to all the gold. So she went back to find it, then the bomb burst and she is killed. At her burial, Jewel explained she was pregnant with another baby, Diana found her true love, Marco and Emerald got married, and Nathaniel and Jasmin took care of Jasmin's sister.

Cast and characters

Main cast

Cristine Reyes as Kristine Jewel Fortalejo
Zanjoe Marudo as Jaime Reyes/Bernard De Silva-Fortalejo
Denise Laurel as Kristine Emerald Fortalejo-De Silva
Rafael Rosell as Marco De Silva
Rayver Cruz as Lance Navarro
Lito Legaspi as Don Leon Fortalejo
Irma Adlawan as Margarita Fortalejo-Cervantes
William Lorenzo as Josef Cervantes
Angel Jacob as Ana Marie Soriano-Fortalejo
Carla Martinez as Julia De Silva
Eric Fructuoso as Alfon De Silva

Additional cast
Arlene Tolibas as Tekla
Bayani Casimiro Jr. as Nonong
Elijah Magundayao as Buboy
JM De Guzman as Nathaniel Cervantes
Bangs Garcia as Diana Montero
Iya Villania as Scarlet Saavedra
Kristel Moreno as Jasmin Cuevo
Neri Naig as Rowena Guevarra
Joross Gamboa as Charlie
Tibo Jumalon as Tibo
Sharmaine Suarez as Stella Elarmo
John Medina as Elmer Saavedra

Special participation
Chin Chin Gutierrez as Kristine Esmeralda Lopez-Fortalejo
Johnny Revilla as Ernesto De Silva
Christian Vasquez as Romano Fortalejo
Wendy Valdez as Alicia De Silva

Guest cast
Chinggoy Alonzo as Don Cesar Zaragoza
Gilette Sandico as Gemma Zaragoza
Tanya Gomez as Juaning Reyes
Arnold Reyes as Rufo
Cai Cortez as Keanna
Richard Yap as Jandy
Miles Ocampo as Maya
Albie Casiño as Dominic Ellarmo
Josef Elizalde as Nathaniel's Friend
Princess Manzon as Prostitute
Cathy Remperas as Prized Girlfriend
Kyra Custodio as Young Margarita Fortalejo
Marikit Morales as Daisy
Mary Roldan as Cora
Auriette Divina as Demi Ingrid Alejo
Gee-Ann Abrahan as Ashley
Joyce So as Ruby
Bam Romana as GBoy
Kelly Misa as Mylene
Manuel Chua as Scarlet's ex-boyfriend
Jose Sarasola as Diana's new boyfriend (in a final episode)

Reception

Ratings

According to Kantar Media, the pilot episode of the hit series scored 18.6% ratings nationwide.

Music
 Ngayon At Kailanman - Vina Morales (Official Theme Song)
 Hanggang May Kailanman - Carol Banawa
 Sakaling Malimutan Ka - Carol Banawa
 Di Ko Kayang Limutin - Liezel Garcia

Launch
Kristine was launched as one of the ABS-CBN's offerings for the 60th Celebration of Filipino Soap Opera ("Ika-60 taon ng Pinoy Soap Opera") during the ABS-CBN Trade Launch for the first quarter of 2010, entitled "Bagong Simula" (New Beginning).

Controversial leave 
Lead star Denise Laurel, who plays Cristine Reyes' sister Emerald, took an indefinite leave during the season due to constraints regarding some scenes concerning her image. The indefinite leave left fans of the popular primetime series wondering if her recurring character would be back in the second and final season.

See also
Precious Hearts Romances Presents

References

External links
Official website
 

ABS-CBN drama series
2010 Philippine television series debuts
2011 Philippine television series endings
Philippine romance television series
Television shows based on books
Filipino-language television shows
Television shows set in Manila